Juan Bravo (c. 1483, Atienza–24 April 1521, Villalar de los Comuneros) was a leader of the rebel Comuneros in the Castilian Revolt of the Comuneros.

His father was Gonzalo Ortega Bravo de Laguna, and his mother was María de Mendoza, daughter of the Count of Monteagudo. In 1504 he married Catalina del Río, they went to live in Segovia, and they had a daughter called María de Mendoza.

In 1510 he married a second time, to María Coronel, grand daughter of Abraham Seneor, a converso. They had two sons, Andrea Bravo de Mendoza and Juan Bravo de Mendoza.

He took part in the Castilian War of the Communities, and he was a leader of the rebel army which was defeated at the Battle of Villalar.  He was captured, and beheaded the day after the battle.

There is now a monument to him in Segovia.

References
 
 
 
 

1483 births
1521 deaths
People from the Province of Guadalajara
Spanish rebels
People executed by Spain by decapitation
Executed Spanish people
16th-century executions by Spain
16th-century Spanish people
People of the Revolt of the Comuneros